Joseph Alfred Langlais (born October 9, 1950) is a Canadian former professional ice hockey player who played 25 games in the National Hockey League with the Minnesota North Stars between 1974 and 1975. The rest of his career, which lasted from 1970 to 1980, was spent in various minor leagues. As a youth, he played in the 1963 Quebec International Pee-Wee Hockey Tournament with a minor ice hockey team from Lévis, Quebec.

Career statistics

Regular season and playoffs

References

External links
 

1950 births
Living people
Canadian ice hockey right wingers
Flint Generals (IHL) players
Ice hockey people from Quebec
Jersey Devils players
Long Island Ducks (ice hockey) players
Minnesota North Stars players
New Haven Nighthawks players
Richmond Robins players
Saginaw Gears players
Sorel Éperviers players
Sportspeople from Saguenay, Quebec
Toledo Hornets players
Tulsa Oilers (1964–1984) players
Undrafted National Hockey League players